Willi Heeks (13 February 1922 in Moorlage – 13 August 1996 in Bocholt) was a racing driver from Germany. He participated in 2 World Championship Grands Prix, debuting on 3 August 1952. He scored no championship points.

Complete World Championship results
(key)

1922 births
1996 deaths
German racing drivers
German Formula One drivers
AFM Formula One drivers
People from Emsland